The Jiajika mine is one of the largest lithium mines in China. The mine is located in Tagong township,  Sichuan province, central China. 

The Jiajika mine has reserves amounting to 80.5 million tonnes of lithium ore grading 1.28% lithium thus resulting 1.03 million tonnes of lithium.

Environmental issues 
The Jiajika mine has polluted the environment. It has killed fish in Liqi River and killed yaks in the nearby grassland. The contaminated water also killed people.

References 

Lithium mines in China